Gherea may refer to:
Constantin Dobrogeanu-Gherea, Romanian Marxist philosopher, or either of his two sons:
Alexandru Dobrogeanu-Gherea, communist militant
Ionel Gherea, philosopher and pianist
a former village in the commune of Ceanu Mare, Cluj County

Romanian-language surnames